The 1988–89 South Alabama Jaguars basketball team represented the University of South Alabama during the 1988–89 NCAA Division I men's basketball season. The Jaguars were led by head coach Ronnie Arrow, in the second year of his first stint as head coach. They played their home games at the Mobile Civic Center, and were members of the Sun Belt Conference. They finished the season 23–9, 11–3 in Sun Belt play to finish in first place. They won the Sun Belt tournament to earn an automatic bid to the 1989 NCAA tournament as the 11 seed in the Southeast region. In the opening round, the Jaguars upset Alabama before losing to the eventual National champion, Michigan, in the second round.

Roster

Schedule and results

|-
!colspan=9 style=| Regular season

|-
!colspan=9 style=| Sun Belt Conference tournament

|-
!colspan=9 style=| NCAA tournament

NBA draft

References

South Alabama Jaguars men's basketball seasons
South Alabama
South Alabama
1988 in sports in Alabama
1989 in sports in Alabama